The 1977–78 season was Manchester United's 76th season in the Football League, and their third consecutive season in the top division of English football. It was their first season under the management of Dave Sexton, following the dismissal of Tommy Docherty in the close season after he made public his love affair with the wife of the club's physiotherapist. As FA Cup holders they contested the Charity Shield and were joint holders with league champions Liverpool, but failed to make an impact in Europe or on either of the domestic cups and finished only 10th in the league – lower than in either of their previous two seasons since promotion.

They were in fact expelled from the Cup Winners' Cup after their fans ran riot in France after the first leg of their first round tie with Saint-Etienne; they were reinstated to the competition on appeal but had to play the return leg at a neutral venue.

Winger Gordon Hill, who was transferred to Derby County (then managed by Tommy Docherty) at the end of the season, bowed out of Old Trafford in style as the club's top scorer once again with 17 goals in the league and 19 in all competitions.

FA Charity Shield

First Division

FA Cup

League Cup

Cup Winners' Cup

Squad statistics

References

Manchester United F.C. seasons
Manchester United